ABC Scope was a public affairs program that appeared on the ABC television network from November 11, 1964 to March 2, 1968, hosted by Howard K. Smith, the future anchor of the ABC Evening News. News reporters Louis Rukeyser, Frank Reynolds and John Scali also appeared.  The program provided its viewer with an in-depth look at the important political, economic and social issues that the world faced in the mid-to-late 1960s. Although Smith hosted the show, the program provided its audience with one-on-one interviews of important newsmakers, documentaries on various subjects and roundtable discussions between a group of experts.

Many editions dealt with a review of the week in the Vietnam War.

External links
 ABC Scope at the Internet Movie Database

References 

1964 American television series debuts
1968 American television series endings
1960s American television news shows
American Broadcasting Company original programming
English-language television shows